The 1990–91 season was the 57th Tercera División season of Spanish football from its creation in 1929. There were 17 groups of 20 teams each. The top four teams in each group played in the Segunda División B play-off, while the last four teams in each group were relegated to Divisiones Regionales de Fútbol.

Classification

Group I

Group II

Group III

Group IV

Group V

Group VI Norte

Group VI Sur

Group VII

Group VIII

Group IX

Group X

Group XI

Group XII

Group XIII

Group XIV

Group XV

Group XVI

Group XVII

See also
 1990–91 Play-Off

Notes

External links
AREFE

 
Tercera División seasons
4
Spain